Gion Station (祇園駅) is the name of two train stations in Japan:

 Gion Station (Fukuoka) on the Kūkō Line
 Gion Station (Chiba) on the Kururi Line